Sphenacodontoidea is a node-based clade that is defined to include the most recent common ancestor of Sphenacodontidae and Therapsida and its descendants (including mammals). Sphenacodontoids are characterised by a number of synapomorphies concerning proportions of the bones of the skull and the teeth.

The sphenacodontoids evolved from earlier sphenacodonts such as Haptodus via a number of transitional stages of small, unspecialised pelycosaurs.

Classification
The following taxonomy follows Fröbisch et al. (2011) and Benson (2012) unless otherwise noted.

Class Synapsida
 Sphenacodontoidea
 Family †Sphenacodontidae
 Therapsida

See also
 Evolution of mammals

References

 Laurin, M. and Reisz, R. R., 1997, Autapomorphies of the main clades of synapsids - Tree of Life Web Project

 
Transitional fossils
Extant Pennsylvanian first appearances